ING is the Turkish subsidiary of the ING Group, an international banking company. The bank was formerly known as Oyak Bank which became part of ING Group in December 2007. It provides retail and commercial banking services to individuals and businesses in Turkey, together with related financial products such as insurance and asset management. It was a financial subsidiary of OYAK Holding (Turkish Army Members Solidarity Fund) between 1993 and 2007.

History
US-based First National Bank of Boston opened a branch in Istanbul, Turkey in 1984. The bank has operated independently since 1990 with three companies owning majority stakes: Alarko, Cerrahoğlu and Oyak.

The bank's name changed to Turkish Boston Bank A.Ş. again in 1991 and then OYAK purchased the other shares, becoming the only shareholder of the bank. Finally the bank was again renamed to Oyak Bank 1996.

In 2002 Sümerbank merged into Oyak Bank, which had over 300 branches around Turkey. The bank has a branch in Ireland and another one in Germany.

External links

 ING Bank Home Page (English version)

Banks of Turkey
ING Group
Banks established in 1984
Turkish companies established in 1984